Anil Vasudev Salgaocar (26 December 1940 – 1 January 2016) was an Indian mining businessman, and a member of the Goa Legislative Assembly.

Anil Salgaocar was born on 26 December 1940, the son of Vasudev Salgaocar and brother of Shivanand Salgaocar and Dattaraj Salgaocar. He was the owner of Salgaocar Mining Industries Private Limited. Salgaocar died in Singapore on 1 January 2016, aged 75.

Salgaocar was survived by his wife Lakshmi and two daughters, Chandana and Purnima, and his sons Sameer and Arjun, who are also active in politics.

Salgaocar has been named in the Panama Papers.

References

1940 births
2016 deaths
Businesspeople from Goa
People named in the Panama Papers
People from Vasco da Gama, Goa